The revised Dwikora Cabinet was the Indonesian Cabinet which served under President Sukarno from February 1966 to March 1966. The Cabinet was formed under an extremely tense political situation and it was expected that this Cabinet would address the concerns of the people. It was during a meeting of this Cabinet that unidentified troops surrounded the Presidential Palace causing to Sukarno to escape to Bogor from where he gave Supersemar to Lieutenant General Suharto.

President
President/Prime Minister/Supreme Commander of the National Armed Forces of the Republic/Mandatory of the Provisional People's Consultative Assembly (MPRS)/Great Leader of the Revolution: Sukarno

Cabinet Presidium
First Deputy Prime Minister/Minister of Foreign Affairs and Foreign Trade: Subandrio
Second Deputy Prime Minister/Coordinating Minister of Distribution/Minister of Higher Education and Science: Johannes Leimena
Third Deputy Prime Minister/Chairman of MPRS: Chaerul Saleh
Fourth Deputy Prime Minister/Vice Chairman of MPRS: Idham Chalid
Minister of Information: Maj. Gen. Achmadi

Ministers in the Field of Law and Home Affairs
Coordinating Minister: Sartono
Minister of Home Affairs/Governor of Jakarta: Maj. Gen. Soemarno Sosroatmojo
Minister of Justice: A. Astrawinata
Chief Justice of the Supreme Court: Wirjono Prodjodikoro
Attorney General: Brig. Gen. Sutardhio

Ministers in the Field of Defense and Security
Coordinating Minister: Maj. Gen. Sarbini
Deputy Coordinating Minister: Maj. Gen. Mursyid
Commander of the Army: Maj. Gen. Suharto
Commander of the Navy: Rear Admiral Muljadi
Deputy Commander of the Navy: Maj. Gen. (Marine Corps) Hartono
Commander of the Air Force: Air Vice Marshal Sri Muljono Herlambang
Chief of Police: Police Gen. Sutjipto Judodihardjo

Ministers in the Field of Finance
Coordinating Minister: Sumarno
Governor of the Central Bank: Jusuf Muda Dalam
First Lieutenant Governor of the Central Bank: J. D. Massie
Lieutenant Governors of the Central Bank: Arifin Harahap and Mohamad Hasan
Minister of State Funds: Surjadi
Minister of Expenditures: Police Brig. Gen. Hugeng Imam Santoso
Minister of Insurance: Sucipto S. Amidharmo

Ministers in the Field of Development
Coordinating Minister/Minister of Tourism: Hamengkubuwono IX
Minister of Manpower: Sutomo Martopradoto
Minister of National Research: Suhadi Reksowardojo
Minister of Oil and Natural Gas: Maj. Gen. Ibnu Sutowo
Minister of Mining: Armunanto
Minister of Basic Industries: Brig. Gen. M. Jusuf

Ministers in the Field of People's Industries
Coordinating Minister: Maj. Gen. Azis Saleh
Minister of Textile Industry: Brig. Gen. Danudirdjo Ashari
Minister of Light Industry: Air Vice Marshal Suharnoko Harbani
Minister of Hand Made Industry: Hadi Thayeb
Minister of Self-Reliance/Assistant Minister to Coordinating Minister of People's Industries: T. D. Pardede

Ministers in the Field of Public Works and Energy
Coordinating Minister: Sutami
Minister of Electricity and Energy: Ir. Setiadi Reksoprodjo
Minister of Irrigation: P. C. Harjadisudirdja
Minister of Road Maintenance: Brig. Gen. Hartawan Wirjodiprodjo
Minister of Job Creations and Constructions: David Gee Cheng
Minister of Trans-Sumatra Highway: Bratanata

Ministers in the Field of Agriculture and Agrarian Affairs
Coordinating Minister: Sadjarwo
Minister of Agriculture: Sukarno
Minister of Plantations: Frans Seda
Minister of Forestry: Sudjarwo
Minister of Agrarian Affairs: Rudolf Hermanses
Minister of People's Irrigation and Village Development: Surachman

Ministers in the Field of Distribution
Minister of National Trade: Brig. Gen. Achmad Jusuf
Minister of Land Transportation: Lt. Gen. Hidayat
Minister of Post and Telecommunication: Air Marshal S. Suryadarma
Minister of Air Transportation: Partono
Minister of Transmigration and Cooperatives: Achadi

Ministers in the Field of Maritime Affairs
Coordinating Minister/Minister of Sea Transportation: Marines Maj. Gen. Ali Sadikin
Minister of Fisheries and Sea Exploration: Rear Admiral Hamzah Atmohandojo
Minister of Maritime Industries: Mardanus

Ministers in the Field of Welfare
Coordinating Minister: Muljadi Djojomartono
Minister of Social Affairs: Rusiah Sardjono
Minister of Health: Maj. Gen. Dr. Satrio

Ministers in the Field of Religious Affairs
Coordinating Minister/Minister of Religious Affairs: Sjaifuddin Zuchri
Minister of Hajj Affairs: Farid Mar'uf
Minister of Government Liaison with Ulamas: Marzuki Jatim
Assistant to Minister of Religious Affairs: Abdul Fattah Jasin

Ministers in the Field of Education and Culture
Coordinating Minister: Prijono
Minister of Basic Education and Culture: Sumardjo
Minister of Sports: Maladi

Ministers in the Field of Communication with the People
Coordinating Minister: Ruslan Abdulgani
Minister of Government Liaison with MPRS/Mutual Assistance People's Representative Council (DPR-GR)/Supreme Advisory Council (DPA)/National Front: W. J. Rumambi
Secretary General of the National Front: J. K. Tumakaka

Presidential Advisers
Presidential Adviser for Funds and Forces: Notohamiprodjo
Presidential Advisers for National Security: Police Gen. Sukarno Djojonegoro and Munandjat
Special Minister of Security: Lt. Col. Sjafei

State Ministers Attached to the Cabinet Presidium
State Ministers: Oei Tjoe Tat, Brig. Gen. Sukendro, Aminuddin Azis, Sudibjo, Brig. Gen. Mudjoko

State Officials
Vice Chairman of the MPRS: Ali Sastroamidjojo
Vice Chairman of the MPRS/Chairman of the National Resilience Institute (LEMHANAS): Maj. Gen. Wilujo Puspojudo

Officials with Ministerial status
State Secretary: M. Ichsan
Second Vice Chairman of DPA: Sujono Hadinoto
Deputy Speakers of DPR-GR: Sjarif Thayeb, Asmara Hadi, Rear Admiral Mursalin Daeng Mamangung, Achmad Syaichu
Financial Auditors: Sukardan, Radius Prawiro, Mochtar Usman, H. A. Pandelaki
Director General of the National Atomic Agency: G. A. Siwabessy
Commander of the Establishment of Aviation Industry Command (KOPELAPIP): Air Marshal Omar Dani
Project Manager for KOPELAPIP: Kurwet Kartaadiredja

Changes
On 18 March 1966, Subandrio, Chaerul Saleh, Setiadi Reksoprodjo, Sumardjo, Oei Tjoe Tat, Jusuf Muda Dalam, Armunanto, Surachman, Sutomo Martopradoto, Astrawinata, Achmadi, Sjafei, J. K. Tumakaka, Achadi, and Soemarno Sosroatmojo were arrested. A number of interim ministers were appointed to replace the 15 arrested ministers as follows:

 Ad interim ministers in the cabinet presidium
 Hamengkubuwana IX
 Adam Malik
 Roeslan Abdulgani
 Idham Chalid
 Johannes Leimena
 Other ad interim ministers
 Minister of Foreign Affairs and Overseas Economic Relations: Adam Malik
 Minister of Justice: Chief Justice of the Supreme Court: Wirjono Prodjodikoro
 Minister of Labor: Frans Seda (retained his position as Minister of Plantations)
 Minister of Mining: Maj. Gen. Ibnu Sutowo (retained his position as Minister of Oil and Natural Gas)
 Minister of Electricity and Energy: Sutami (retained his position as Coordinating Minister)

To replace Saleh as Chairman of the Provisional People's Consultative Assembly, Gen. Wiluyo Puspoyudo of the Army was appointed to this position in an acting capacity.

External links
 Revised Dwikora Cabinet

References
 
 

Transition to the New Order
Cabinets of Indonesia
1966 establishments in Indonesia
1966 disestablishments in Indonesia
Cabinets established in 1966
Cabinets disestablished in 1966